Konrad Lienert (27 January 1933 – 20 March 2014) was an Austrian pair skater. Competing with Liesl Ellend, he became a two-time national champion (1957–1958). The pair finished fourth at the European Figure Skating Championships in 1955 and 1957, and ninth at the 1956 Winter Olympics.

Results

With Ellend

With Widstruk

References

Navigation

Austrian male pair skaters
Olympic figure skaters of Austria
Figure skaters at the 1956 Winter Olympics
1933 births
2014 deaths